The 2015 Supertaça de Angola (28th edition) was contested by Recreativo do Libolo, the 2014 Girabola champion and Benfica de Luanda, the 2014 cup winner. Recreativo do Libolo was the winner, making it its 1st title.

Match details

See also
 2014 Angola Cup
 2014 Girabola
 Recreativo do Libolo players
 Benfica de Luanda players

References

Supertaça de Angola
Super Cup